Charles Huff Jr. (born April 26, 1983) is an American football coach. He is the head football coach at Marshall University, a position he has held since the 2021 season. Prior to Marshall, he was the associate head coach and running backs coach at the University of Alabama. A coach with stints at Mississippi State and Penn State, he has gained the reputation of being one of the top recruiters in college football.

Playing career
Huff played at Hampton University, joining the football team as a walk-on fullback. In addition to fullback, he also spent time at tight end and guard before being named the starting center. He was named a team captain his senior season in addition to being the starting center.

Coaching career
Huff got his first coaching job at Tennessee State in 2006 working under Tigers offensive coordinator Fred Kaiss, who he played under at Hampton. He was named the tight ends and special teams coach in 2007, and also added football operations duties as well. He left to join the coaching staff at Maryland as the assistant offensive line coach in 2009, before joining his alma mater Hampton in 2010 as the offensive line coach and run game coordinator. He spent 2011 as an offensive quality control coach at Vanderbilt under first-year Commodores head coach and former Maryland offensive coordinator James Franklin. He spent 2012 with the Buffalo Bills as their assistant running backs coach under head coach Chan Gailey before joining the coaching staff at Western Michigan in 2013 as their running backs coach under first year head coach P. J. Fleck.

Penn State
Huff was named the running backs coach and special teams coordinator at Penn State in 2014, reuniting with James Franklin, who was the offensive coordinator at Maryland when Huff was the assistant offensive line coach. During his time at Penn State, he played a crucial role in the recruitment and development of running back Saquon Barkley, who was named a consensus All-American, 2× Big Ten Offensive Player of the Year, and left as one of the program's top running backs of all time.

Mississippi State
Huff joined the coaching staff at Mississippi State in 2018, the first hire of new Bulldogs head coach and former Penn State offensive coordinator Joe Moorhead. In his lone season at Starkville, their running backs ran the ball 253 times, and did not lose a fumble once.

Alabama
Huff was named the associate head coach and running backs coach at Alabama in 2019.

Marshall
Huff was hired as the head coach at Marshall in 2021, replacing Doc Holliday. On September 10, 2022, Huff led Marshall to their second all-time victory over a top-10 opponent after defeating the No. 8-ranked Notre Dame Fighting Irish 26–21 in South Bend, Indiana. Huff earned his first bowl win as a head coach in the 2022 Myrtle Beach Bowl against the UConn Huskies 28–14.

Head coaching record

References

External links
 
 Marshall profile
 Alabama profile
 Mississippi State profile
 Penn State profile
 Western Michigan profile
 Hampton profile

1983 births
Living people
American football centers
American football fullbacks
American football offensive guards
American football tight ends
Alabama Crimson Tide football coaches
Buffalo Bills coaches
Hampton Pirates football coaches
Hampton Pirates football players
Marshall Thundering Herd football coaches
Maryland Terrapins football coaches
Mississippi State Bulldogs football coaches
Penn State Nittany Lions football coaches
Tennessee State Tigers football coaches
Vanderbilt Commodores football coaches
Western Michigan Broncos football coaches
People from Denton, Maryland
Coaches of American football from Maryland
Players of American football from Maryland
African-American coaches of American football
African-American players of American football
21st-century African-American sportspeople